The following is a list of Teen Choice Award winners and nominees for Choice Hissy Fit. This is awarded to actors of any gender for their performance of an onscreen meltdown and is chosen by 13–19 year olds. From its inception in 1999, it was an award exclusively given out for film work but in 2017, it began recognizing work in television as well.

References

Hissy Fit
Hissy Fit
Awards established in 1999